Aero GP is an international air racing series with up to eight specially designed high-performance sports planes all racing together at speeds of up to 400 km/h (250 mph) around a tight circuit just metres off the ground and from each other. The competing pilots are military and civilian pilots from around the world. Aero GP is the only international, televised event where aeroplanes race simultaneously. Aero GP officially started in 2005 in Slovenia. From there it has travelled to several countries in Europe and Middle East. Instead of the checked flag pattern, Aero GP judges its participants on the basis on points won in individual events and hence, there is no clear winner until the end of the event. The YouTube page for Aero GP has not been updated since 2013 and the original website is no longer online so it is assumed that this racing league is now defunct.

Competitive elements 

Three primary disciplines in series decide the annual World Champion Flying Ace:

Air Racing:  All racing at the same time, between six and eight aircraft reach speeds of 500 km/h at just 10 metres above the racecourse.

Air Combat:  A real air-to-air “dogfight”.  Pilots take to the skies in an attempt to outmanoeuvre, hunt down and shoot each other out of the sky, in the style of military air combat.

Barnstorming:  A third element which can consist of any of the following - depending on the venue: aerobatics, stunt flying or precision target dropping - pilots drop bombs from their aircraft at low altitude, aiming at various targets.

History 
The first Aero GP was held in 2005 although the concept dates to 2000. The inaugural event, held in Slovenia, was televised in over 100 countries. Since then Aero GP's have been held in Malta, Romania (twice), The United Kingdom, and Abu Dhabi in the UAE.

The Pilots 

Aero GP pilots have backgrounds in flying a range of military and aerobatic aircraft. They come from a variety of countries and backgrounds.  Fighter pilots,  aerobatics champions,  and civil aviation pilots are all known to compete. They are put through tremendous amounts of G-Force when performing in their aircraft.

Regular Aero GP Pilots

 Andy Bickmore 
 Zoltan Veres 
 "Smokey" Young 
 Gerry Cooper 
 Mark Jefferies

2008 series 
The series consisted of two Aero GP's. June saw the Aero GP team return to Constanta  in Romania and this was followed by a second round in Blackpool, UK.

2009 series 

The 2009 series sees Aero GP visit the Middle East for the first time. Aero GP will be headlining the Al Ain air show in the United Arab Emirates between January 29–31. There are multiple other venues being discussed for 2009 and these will be announced in the new year.

Accidents 

During the Malta show on 10 September 2006, two planes, an Extra EA-200 and a Yakovlev Yak-55, collided just outside Marsamxett Harbour off Valletta. The Swedish pilot of the Yak-55, aerobatics champion Gabor Varga, died instantly. However, the Irish Extra 200 pilot, Eddie Goggins, suffered only minor injuries and was soon released after the crash.

References

External links 
 Aero GP

Further reading 

 Formula 1 air race coming to Mumbai - Times Of India - IANS -  Aug 3, 2011
 The Independent UK, Everything you need to know about... Aero GP,By Amol Rajan, Monday 26 January 2009

Air racing